The 1992–93 Croatian Football Cup was the second season of Croatia's football knockout competition. Inter Zaprešić were the defending champions.

Calendar

First round

|}

Second round

|}

Quarter-finals

|}

Semi-finals

First legs

Second legs

Croatia Zagreb won 3–2 on aggregate.

Hajduk Split won 4–2 on aggregate.

Final

First leg

Second leg

Hajduk Split won 5–3 on aggregate.

See also
1992–93 Croatian First Football League

External links
Official website 
1993 Croatian Football Cup at rsssf.org
1992 Croatian Cup final at rsssf.org

Croatian Football Cup seasons
Croatian Cup, 1992-93
Croatian Cup